The Fifth Avenue Mile is an annual  road race on Fifth Avenue in New York City, United States. The race begins at 80th Street and heads twenty blocks south to 60th Street. First held on September 26, 1981, the race is currently organized by New York Road Runners. The competition regularly attracts world-class runners, who compete in special heats after the regular age division heats. The Fifth Avenue Mile has also inspired similar events in the same mould, including the Anlene Orchard Mile in Singapore.

The record performances of the race are Sydney Maree's victory at the inaugural race in 3:47.52, and Laura Muir's time of 4:14.8 set in 2022. Jennifer Simpson of the United States has historically been the most successful athlete at the competition, having won 8 races. The winners at the most recent edition in 2022 were Jake Wightman and Laura Muir, a second consecutive 'Scottish double' after Wightman and Jemma Reekie won the event in 2021.

The Fifth Avenue Mile was originally held in late September or early October. In 2014 it was moved to mid September near Patriot Day. The race has been sponsored by Pepsi (1981), Mercedes-Benz (1986-1991), Discover Card (1994-1996), Donald Trump (1997-1998), Continental Airlines (2005-2010) and currently New Balance (since 2016).

Winners
Key:

See also
New York City Marathon
New York City Half Marathon

References
General
Turner, Chris (2005-09-22). Fifth Avenue Mile races back into the headlines. IAAF. Retrieved on 2009-09-27.

Specific

External links
 New York Road Runners website
 Winners of the Continental Airlines Fifth Avenue Mile at RunnersWeb.com (1981-2009)
 Historical Fifth Avenue Mile articles from New York Times



Mile races
Recurring sporting events established in 1981
Road running competitions in the United States
Sports competitions in New York City